Calesia is a genus of moths of the family Erebidae. The genus was erected by Achille Guenée in 1852.

Description
Palpi upturned and smoothly scaled, where the second joint reaching vertex of head. Third joint long and naked. Antennae ciliated and with bristles to the joints in male. Thorax, abdomen and legs smoothly scaled. Hindwings with very short cell. Larva with two pairs of abdominal prolegs.

Species
Calesia arhoda Hampson 1910
Calesia caputrubrum Carcasson 1965
Calesia cryptoleuca Carcasson 1965
Calesia dasypterus (Kollar 1844)
Calesia flabellifera Moore 1878
Calesia flaviceps Hampson 1926
Calesia fuscicorpus Hampson 1891
Calesia gastropachoides Guenée 1852
Calesia haemorrhoa Guenée 1852
Calesia hirtisquama Hampson 1926
Calesia karschi (Bartel 1903)
Calesia marginata (Walker 1869)
Calesia nigriannulata Hampson 1926
Calesia nigriventris Aurivillius 1909
Calesia othello (Fawcett 1916)
Calesia pellio Felder & Rogenhofer 1874
Calesia phaiosoma (Hampson 1891)
Calesia proxantha Hampson 1895
Calesia rhodotela Hampson 1926
Calesia roseiceps Hampson 1894
Calesia rufipalpis (Walker 1858)
Calesia simplex Snellen 1880
Calesia stillifera Felder & Rogenhofer 1874
Calesia thermantis Hampson 1926
Calesia vinolia Swinhoe 1903
Calesia xanthognatha Hampson 1926
Calesia zambesita Walker 1865

References

Calpinae